Javorani (Cyrillic: Јаворани), is a village in Kneževo (Skender Vakuf) municipality, near Banja Luka, Republika Srpska, Bosnia and Herzegovina.

History
Until 1955, Javorani belonged to the former Previle Municipality, Kotor Varoš.

Population

Ethnic composition, 1991 census

References 

 Official results from the book: Ethnic composition of Bosnia-Herzegovina population, by municipalities and settlements, 1991. census, Zavod za statistiku Bosne i Hercegovine - Bilten no.234, Sarajevo 1991.

Gallery

People from Javorani 
Lazar Tešanović - One of the Chetniks leader in Bosnia during World War II.

See also
Old St. Nicholas Church, Javorani

External links
Map of Javorani 

Villages in Republika Srpska